Howard Johnson may refer to:

Entertainers

Music
 Howard Johnson (lyricist) (1887–1941), American songwriter
 Howard E. Johnson (1908–1991), American swing alto saxophonist
 Howie Johnson (drummer) (1932–1987), drummer for American rock band The Ventures
 Howard Johnson (jazz musician) (1941–2021), American jazz tubist
 Howard Johnson (soul singer) (born 1956), American R&B singer

Other entertainers
 Howard "Stretch" Johnson (1915–2000), American tap dancer and activist
 Howard David Johnson (born 1954), American painter
 Howard A. Johnson, Jr., special effects artist, see Academy Award for Best Visual Effects

Sportsmen
 Howard Johnson (American football) (1916–1945), American football offensive lineman
 Howard Johnson (footballer) (1925–2015), English footballer
 Howard Johnson (baseball) (born 1960), American baseball player
 Howard Johnson (cricketer) (born 1964), American cricketer
 Howie Johnson (1925–2015), American professional golfer
 Monk Johnson (Howard Johnson, 1894–1973), American baseball player

Other people
 Howard Deering Johnson (1897–1972), American founder of Howard Johnson's restaurants
 Howard Hille Johnson (1846–1913), American blind educator and writer
 Howard Wesley Johnson (1922–2009), American educator; former president of the Massachusetts Institute of Technology
 Howard Johnson (electrical engineer) (born 20th century), in signal integrity and high speed electronic circuit design
 Howard R. Johnson (inventor) (1919–2008), inventor of an alleged perpetual motion device
 Howard Johnson (politician) (1910–2000), British Conservative politician
 Howard R. Johnson (1903–1944), commander of the U.S. Army 501st Parachute Infantry Regiment during World War II
 Howard A. Johnson (1893–1974), Montana Supreme Court justice

Other uses 
 Howard Johnson's, a chain of hotels and restaurants

See also
 Howard Johnston (disambiguation)